Cherry Tree Wind Farm is a small wind farm located approximately 15 km south-east of Seymour, Victoria. The 16 turbine, 57.6 MW farm was developed and constructed by Infigen Energy for John Laing Group. Construction started in January 2019 and was operational in June 2020. The wind farm is expected to generate 182 GWh on average annually, for a capacity factor of 36%.

Operations 
The wind farm began grid commissioning in May 2020 and was fully commissioned in June 2020 and has operated continuously since then. The generation table uses eljmkt nemlog to obtain generation values for each month.

Note: Asterisk indicates power output was limited during the month.

References 

Wind farms in Victoria (Australia)